Biosecurity in New Zealand guards against threats to agriculture and biodiversity, with strict border control measures being taken to prevent unwanted organisms from entering the country.

New Zealand is an island nation that is geographically isolated from any other significant landmass. The species that are present evolved in the absence of organisms from elsewhere and display a high degree of endemism.  Notable is the lack of land-based mammals, except for two species of bat. Indigenous species are at risk from population decline or extinction if any invasive species are introduced.

The Biosecurity Act 1993, which was a world first for biosecurity control, was passed to "restate and reform the law relating to the exclusion, eradication, and effective management of pests and unwanted organisms". The Ministry for Primary Industries is the government department in charge of overseeing New Zealand's biosecurity.

The National Animal Identification and Tracing system for tracing livestock was introduced in 2012, but in 2017 the Mycoplasma bovis outbreak investigation indicated that it was not being fully complied with.

Border controls
As well as biosecurity border controls where there is international passenger and freight movement, government officials have also carried out biosecurity controls within the country. Visitors to New Zealand are most commonly fined for bringing fishing gear, seeds, fruits, bamboo and wooden products at the border.

At sea and airports, cargo, passengers and passenger baggage is checked for unwanted organisms. Any that is found is incinerated.  Passengers must sign a declaration form stating that they do not have anything that constitutes a biosecurity risk to New Zealand. At border control locations such as airports, beagles are used for detecting material that constitutes a biosecurity risk because they are relatively small and less intimidating for people who are uncomfortable around dogs, easy to care for, intelligent and work well for rewards.

If there is a threat of the spread of unwanted organisms within New Zealand containment measures are carried out. Didymo, an invasive algae that was discovered in New Zealand in 2004, has been the subject of a nationwide campaign to prevent its spread. To prevent the spread of the spores of kauri dieback disease it is recommended that pathways in the forests are used and equipment should be cleaned before leaving an area where there are kauri trees.

Combating the Queensland fruit fly 
The Queensland fruit fly (Bactrocera tryoni) has caused over $28.5 million a year in damage to Australian fruit crops. Thus, this species poses a risk to biosecurity in New Zealand. A fruit fly exclusion zone (FFEZ) limits the movement of fruit between Australian states and New Zealand.

2017 Mycoplasma bovis outbreak
On 21 July 2017 the Ministry for Primary Industries was informed that some cattle near Oamaru in the South Island were Mycoplasma bovis positive. Until then, New Zealand and Norway were the only OECD countries free of the disease. (The disease is not hazardous to humans.)

Initially it was thought that the disease had been contained within South Canterbury.
However, subsequently, some 26,000 cattle were culled and in May 2018 the minister, Damien O'Connor, announced that the government had decided (after consultation with farmers) that elimination of the disease was proposed. This would require the culling of some 146,000 cattle over about two years, and would cost $886 million, compared with the cost of $1.2 billion to control the disease. Eradication would also be a "world first".

It appeared that perhaps 70% of farmers were not fully complying with the requirements since 2012 to track movements of cattle, particularly calves sold "for cash". Another possibility is the illegal importing of drugs by veterinary companies. The latest estimate of the number to be culled was 152,000 in June 2018; 126,000 plus the 26,000 already culled.

In August 2018, a Southland farmer was charged under the Biosecurity Act regarding importation of some farm machinery.

Other notable incursions
There have been a number of biosecurity breaches in New Zealand, and on occasion widespread eradications of pest organisms have been carried out.

The painted apple moth was discovered in Auckland in 1999. A biocontainment area was set up and a controversial spray programme carried out to eradicate the moth. Claims that it caused cancer were not upheld.
A single male gypsy moth was caught in a surveillance trap in 2003 within the limits of Hamilton city. An aerial insecticide application programme was initiated to prevent the establishment of any potential population.
The Varroa mite was thought to have become established in New Zealand due to a queen bee being smuggled into the country.
The Queensland fruit fly (Bactrocera tryoni) was discovered in Auckland in 2012 and 2015, resulting in a temporary ban on the movement of plant products in parts of Auckland.
The plant pathogen Pseudomonas syringae pv. actinidiae (PSA), which affects kiwifruit, is thought to have arrived in New Zealand 18 months prior to observed symptoms of the disease. In 2018 growers (but not other operators) won a court case against the government, which found that the government breached its "duty of care" to growers, and the 2010 outbreak was on the "balance of probabilities" due to the importing of kiwifruit pollen by a Te Puke company from 2007 to 2010.  
Myrtle rust (Puccinia psidii) was found in a Kerikeri nursery in May 2017. The rust has now been confirmed at more than 100 locations across Taranaki, Te Puke, Waikato, Northland, Auckland and Wellington.

In May 2005 a hoax claim was made that foot and mouth disease had been released on Waiheke Island and would be released elsewhere unless money was paid and tax reforms made. A full agricultural exotic disease response was initiated. No livestock were allowed to enter or leave the island and stock on the island was tested every 48 hours for symptoms of the virus, which would devastate New Zealand's agricultural exports. After three weeks of testing, no infected animals were detected and the response staff were stood down.

See also
Conservation in New Zealand
Environment of New Zealand
Invasive species in New Zealand
Regulation of animal research in New Zealand
Border Patrol, a television series about the work of Customs, the Ministry for Primary Industries, and the New Zealand Immigration Service

References

Further reading

External links
Biosecurity New Zealand, administered by the Ministry for Primary Industries
Biosecurity at the Department of Conservation

Environmental issues in New Zealand
Agriculture in New Zealand
+
Phytosanitary authorities
Nature conservation in New Zealand